Frank McCabe may refer to:
 Frank McCabe (horse trainer)
 Frank McCabe (basketball)
 Frank McCabe (businessman)